Svenevig or Svennevik is a village in Lindesnes municipality in Agder county, Norway. The Remesfjorden is located along the west side of the village.

References

Villages in Agder
Lindesnes